Teutonic thrash metal is a regional scene of thrash metal music that originated within German-speaking countries during the 1980s.  Along with Bay Area thrash metal, East Coast thrash metal, and Brazilian thrash metal, it was one of the major scenes of thrash metal in the 1980s. The Teutons were a Germanic tribe.

History 
Two bands influential to early Teutonic thrash metal were Destruction (from Lörrach) Holy Moses, (from Aachen). After hearing Venom, both bands soon changed their sound within a matter of weeks to their new and permanent sound.

Other bands soon followed. In 1982, the Gelsenkirchen-based band Sodom released their first demo, Witching Metal.  In their early days Sodom were highly influenced by the NWOBHM, to the point they credit being a trio to bands like Motörhead, Tank, Raven and Venom who also featured power trio line-ups. Their style featured raspy vocals, palm muted guitar riffs, and frantic double bass drumming. Only with the release of their second LP Persecution Mania and with guitarist Frank Blackfire's input to move away from their original sounds and themes they became a thrash metal band for good. Essen's Kreator formed and released its debut album Endless Pain in 1985. Destruction would release their full-length debut Infernal Overkill in the same year. Also around this time, the German-based SPV records created its Steamhammer imprint label, a label designed to primarily sign metal bands. Noise Records was founded soon afterwards. These two labels would help spread the Teutonic thrash metal scene globally.

Teutonic thrash metal would not only come from Germany, but also from Austria, Czech Republic and Switzerland. The biggest band to come outside of Germany that were part of the scene was Coroner, a highly technical and progressive thrash metal band from Switzerland, that was noted for having dark lyrics and accomplished guitar work on the part of Tommy Vetterli (Who would later join Kreator).

Many bands soon split up or changed their sound, resulting in further backlash against the scene.  Kreator went in to make their music more melodic with gothic and industrial influences, while Sodom would attempt a death/thrash style for one album and then move into a more hardcore punk influenced sound.  Destruction would instead face a period of instability which saw them split with frontman Schmier, releasing a thrash album without him (Cracked Brain), then attempting to go radio-friendly and less "thrashy" with the poorly received The Least Successful Human Cannonball. Meanwhile, Schmier would start Headhunter, achieving some success with a slew of three power-thrash albums similar in sound to some of the offerings of Rage.

References 

Extreme metal
German styles of music
Music scenes
Thrash metal